KWIC may refer to:

 Key Word in Context, a way of presenting search results or concordances with context
 KWIC (FM), a radio station (99.3 FM) licensed to Topeka, Kansas, United States
 Kawartha World Issues Centre, a community-based, non-profit, charitable global education and resource centre, serving Peterborough, Ontario and surrounding communities